Skryje is a municipality and village in Havlíčkův Brod District in the Vysočina Region of the Czech Republic. It has about 200 inhabitants.

Administrative parts
Villages of Chrastice and Hostačov are administrative parts of Skryje.

References

Villages in Havlíčkův Brod District